Elections were held in Stormont, Dundas and Glengarry United Counties, Ontario on October 27, 2014 in conjunction with municipal elections across the province.

Stormont, Dundas and Glengarry United Counties Council
Council consists of the mayors and deputy mayors of each of the townships. It does not include the city of Cornwall.

North Dundas

North Glengarry

North Stormont

South Dundas

South Glengarry

South Stormont

References

Stormont
United Counties of Stormont, Dundas and Glengarry